Mars Hill University is a private Christian university in Mars Hill, North Carolina. The university offers 35 undergraduate majors and includes a school of nursing and graduate schools in education, criminal justice, and management. From 1859 to 2013 the school was called Mars Hill College; in August 2013 it officially changed its name to Mars Hill University.

History 

Mars Hill University was founded in 1856, and it is the oldest college or university in western North Carolina. It started as the French Broad Baptist Institute, sharing a name with the nearby French Broad River. In 1859, the university changed its name to Mars Hill, in honor of the hill in ancient Athens on which the Apostle Paul debated Christianity with the city's leading philosophers. During the American Civil War the university was closed for two years, but it reopened after the war. From 1897 to 1938 the university, under the leadership of Robert Moore, enjoyed substantial financial and physical growth. In 1921 Mars Hill became an accredited junior college. Hoyt Blackwell served as president from 1938 to 1966, and under his leadership Mars Hill became an accredited four-year college in 1962. From 1966 to 1996 Fred Bentley served as the college's president. Bentley was, at the time of his appointment in 1966, one of the youngest college presidents in the United States. 
Dan Lunsford, a 1969 graduate of MHU, served as university president from 2002 to 2018. Under Lunsford, Mars Hill University constructed three new dormitories, a new health sciences building to house its nursing program, a new classroom building to house the business department (the most popular major on campus), completely renovated and greatly expanded the math and sciences classroom building, upgraded its athletic facilities, tripled its endowment, increased its student enrollment, and started a graduate school in education. In June 2018, John Anthony "Tony" Floyd became the university's sixth president in 121 years.

In 2008, Mars Hill gained autonomy from the Baptist State Convention of North Carolina when the state convention voted to eliminate the requirement that it have final approval over who could serve as trustees for the school; this ruling allows the university to choose non-Baptists as trustees. The state convention also agreed to start transferring funds traditionally given directly to the university into a new scholarship fund for Baptist students. The move was made in conjunction with the four other remaining N.C. Baptist Colleges – Gardner–Webb University, Campbell University, Wingate University, and Chowan University. The university, while maintaining a cooperative relationship with the North Carolina Baptist Convention and acknowledging its Baptist roots, is no longer directly associated with any Baptist church or organization, but proclaims in its mission statement that it "is an academic community rooted in the Christian faith", and that the university is "committed to an emphasis on service and Christian ethics." The college yearbook is called the Laurel, the college literary magazine is the Cadenza, and the college newspaper is The Hilltop.

Mars Hill is accredited by the Commission on Colleges of the Southern Association of Colleges and Schools to award bachelor's and master's degrees, and is an affiliate of the National Association of Independent Colleges and Universities, Council of Independent Colleges, the Appalachian College Association, and other similar organizations.

Academics 

The university offers six undergraduate degrees (Bachelor of Arts, Bachelor of Science, Bachelor of Science in Nursing (BSN), Bachelor of Music, Bachelor of Fine Arts, and Bachelor of Social Work), three graduate degrees (Master of Arts, Master of Education, and Master of Management), and 35 majors. In May 2013 the university awarded its first M.Ed degrees. The university recently added a M.A. in criminal justice program, and a Master of Management program. In August 2016 the university opened a Bachelor of Science in Nursing (BSN) program. The most popular majors are in the fields of business administration and management, education, social work, physical education teaching and coaching, and general psychology. In 1932 Lamar Stringfield, a Mars Hill alumnus, formed the North Carolina Symphony, the first state-supported orchestra in the nation. The "Bailey Mountain Cloggers", the university's dance team, have won 23 national championships in clogging, and they have performed all over the United States and internationally in Canada, Mexico, England, Scotland, Ireland, Austria, France, Greece, Poland, and the Czech Republic. In 2002 the university opened the Ramsey Center for Regional Studies. Named after an alumnus who served a record four terms as the Speaker of the North Carolina House of Representatives, the center is dedicated to preserving the heritage and culture of the people of the Southern Appalachian Mountains.

The university's enrollment is typically around 1,200 traditional students, with more than 200 students in its nontraditional degree program. In its 2022-2023 survey of "America's Best Colleges", U.S. News & World Report ranked Mars Hill among the South's Top 20 Regional Colleges. U.S. News also rated Mars Hill at #2 in the South for "Best Colleges for Veterans", based on its participation in "federal initiatives helping veterans and active-duty service members pay for their degrees." In 2012 and 2014 Mars Hill also ranked among the Top 20 baccalaureate colleges (out of 100 surveyed) in Washington Monthly's annual survey of the nations' best colleges. In 2015 Washington Monthly ranked Mars Hill 23rd nationally out of 344 baccalaureate colleges surveyed; in 2016 it ranked 24th nationally out of 230 baccalaureate colleges surveyed. Mars Hill has been named to the President's Higher Education Community Service Honor Roll five times since the award's inception in 2006, including twice "with distinction" for general community service.

Campus
The university has a scenic  campus; most of the dormitories are located atop two hills, named "men's hill" and "women's hill". The main campus is located in a small valley between the two hills. The university is surrounded by the Appalachian Mountains; from various points on campus it is possible to see Mount Mitchell, the highest peak east of the Mississippi River. Bailey Mountain (nicknamed "Old Bailey") is located about a mile (1.5 km) northwest from campus and is a local landmark. Interstate 26 is located one mile east of the university, and provides access to the nearby cities of Asheville, North Carolina, to the south, and Johnson City, Tennessee to the north.

Athletics

The university is a Division II member of the National Collegiate Athletic Association (NCAA), and it is also a member of the South Atlantic Conference. Mars Hill's sports mascot is the mountain lion; the university's colors are royal blue and gold.

Notable alumni 
John S. Battle (1890–1972), Governor of Virginia from 1950 to 1954, served on President Dwight D. Eisenhower's Civil Rights Commission. Attended Mars Hill when it was a junior college, later earned a law degree from the University of Virginia.
Archie Campbell (1914–1987) American comedian, writer, and star of Hee Haw, a popular, long-running country-flavored network television variety show. He was also a recording artist with several hits on the RCA label in the 1960s.
Mike Houston, (born 1971), head football coach at East Carolina University. From 2016 to 2018 he was the head football coach at James Madison University, and in 2016 he coached JMU to the NCAA Division I Football Championship Subdivision (FCS) National Championship with a 14–1 record. In 2017, he again coached James Madison to a 14–1 record and a second straight appearance in the FCS national championship game, but lost to North Dakota State. He was also named the American Football Coaches Association National Coach of the Year in 2016. At Mars Hill, he was a tight end on the football team. 
Woodrow W. Jones (1914–2002), United States Congressman from North Carolina from 1950 to 1957. Served as the Chairman of North Carolina's Democratic Party Executive Committee; was appointed by President Lyndon Johnson as the judge for the United States District Court for the Western District of North Carolina in 1968. He served as a federal district judge until his retirement in 1985.
Dan Locklair (born 1949), Professor of Music and Composer-in-Residence at Wake Forest University, internationally known composer who has won awards from the Kennedy Center for the Performing Arts. His work "The Peace May Be Exchanged" was performed at the funeral service for President Ronald Reagan at the Washington National Cathedral in June 2004.
Graham Martin (1912–1990), Foreign Service Officer, U.S. Ambassador to Thailand (1963–1969); U.S. Ambassador to Italy (1969–1973); last U.S. Ambassador to South Vietnam (1973–1975). He is buried in Arlington National Cemetery.
Wayne Oates (1917–1999), psychologist and minister at the University of Louisville medical school who fused psychology and theology to create many of the practices used in modern pastoral counseling. He is also credited with coining the word "workaholic".
Becca Pizzi (born 1980), first American woman to complete and win the World Marathon Challenge. The event involves completing seven full 26.2-mile marathons on seven continents in seven days. She also broke the female record for the challenge, completing all seven marathons in 6 days, 18 hours, and 38 minutes.
Erwin Potts (1932–2017), former president and CEO of the McClatchy Company, the second-largest newspaper chain in the United States. Became president of the company in 1989 and was CEO from 1996 until his retirement in 2001. The company owns 30 daily newspapers in 15 states.
David Price (born 1940), United States Congressman from North Carolina's Fourth District from 1987 to 1995 and 1997 to 2023. After graduating from Mars Hill, he earned divinity and doctoral degrees from Yale University and taught political science at Duke University.
Liston B. Ramsey (1919–2001), North Carolina state legislator who served 19 terms in the state assembly. He was elected Speaker of the State House of Representatives four times in the 1980s, and was the first legislator in the state's history to have been elected to the Speaker's office for four terms.
Jonas Randolph (born 1990), winner of the 2011 Harlon Hill Trophy, the NCAA Division II equivalent of the Heisman Trophy. As a running back for the Mars Hill football team he gained 5,608 yards from 2008 to 2011, a school and South Atlantic Conference record. 
Eugene L. Roberts, Jr., (born 1932), National Editor of The New York Times from 1969 to 1972; Executive Editor of The Philadelphia Inquirer from 1972 to 1990; Managing Editor of The New York Times from 1990 to 1997. In 2007, he won the Pulitzer Prize in history for his book The Race Beat: The Press, the Civil Rights Struggle, and the Awakening of a Nation.
Lacy Thornburg (born 1929), North Carolina State Attorney General from 1985 to 1993; United States Federal District Judge for Western North Carolina, 1995–2009.
Ludovico Corsini (born 1993), Milan, Commonwealth Games and Olympic Athlete in the sport of Swimming.

References

External links

 Official website
 Official athletics website
 Mars Hill College Yearbooks: 1917-2011

 
University and college buildings on the National Register of Historic Places in North Carolina
Colonial Revival architecture in North Carolina
Neoclassical architecture in North Carolina
Buildings and structures in Madison County, North Carolina
National Register of Historic Places in Madison County, North Carolina
Historic districts on the National Register of Historic Places in North Carolina
Educational institutions established in 1856
1856 establishments in North Carolina
Universities and colleges affiliated with the Southern Baptist Convention
Private universities and colleges in North Carolina
Liberal arts colleges in North Carolina